This is a list of music bands originating from Spain. For individual musicians, see List of Spanish musicians. See also Music of Spain.

A
 Aerolíneas Federales
 Alaska y los Pegamoides
 Alaska y Dinarama
 Al-Firdaus Ensemble
 Amaral
 Amarok
 Amistades Peligrosas
 Amparanoia
 Andy & Lucas
 Ángeles del Infierno
 Antònia Font
 Avalanch
 Aventuras de Kirlian
 Aviador Dro
 Avulsed
 Azúcar Moreno

B
 Baccara
 Barón Rojo
 Barrabás
 Barricada
 Bellepop
 Betagarri
 Boikot
 Bravo
 Los Bravos
 Los Brincos
 La Buena Vida

C
 Cadillac
 Café Quijano
 Camela
 Los Canarios
 El Canto Del Loco
 La Casa Azul
 Casta
 Celtas Cortos
 
 Chambao
 Los Chichos
 El Chojin
 Chucho
 Los Chunguitos
 Cómplices
 Contradanza

D
 Danza Invisible
 Dareysteel
 Dark Moor
 DarkSun
 Darna
 La Década Prodigiosa
 Décima Víctima
 Def Con Dos
 Delorean
 Los del Mar
 Los del Río
 Los Diablos
 Dixebra
 D'Nash
 Dover
 Duncan Dhu
 Dúo Dinámico
 Duo kie 
 Dvicio

E
 EASO Choir
 Elefantes
 Ella Baila Sola
 Eskorbuto
 Esplendor Geométrico
 Estopa
 La Excepción
 Extremoduro
 El Último de la Fila

F
 Facto delafé y las flores azules
 Family
 Fangoria
 Fito y los Fitipaldis
 Forever Slave
 Fórmula V

G
 Gossos
 Los Gandules
 Golpes Bajos
 Las Grecas
 La Guardia

H
 Haemorrhage
 Hamlet
 Héroes del Silencio
 Hidrogenesse
 Hinds
 Hombres G

I
 Itoiz

J
 Jarabe de Palo

K
 K-Narias
 Kaxta
 Ketama
 The Killer Barbies
 Kortatu

L
 Lax'n'Busto
 Le Mans
 Leño
 
 Los Limones
 Los Suaves
 Lole y Manuel
 Lunae

M
 Macaco
 Machetazo
 Mägo de Oz
 La Mala Rodríguez
 Marea
 Marlango
 M-Clan
 Mecano
 Mezquita
 Milladoiro
 Mocedades
 Modestia Aparte
 Mojinos Escozíos
 La Musgaña
 Los Mustang

N
 Nacha Pop
 Nahemah
 Negu Gorriak
 Nena Daconte
 Los Nikis
 Nosoträsh

Ñ
 Ñu

O
 OBK
 Obrint Pas
 Obús
 October People
 Ojos de Brujo
 La Oreja De Van Gogh
 Orquesta Mondragón

P
 La Pandilla
 Parálisis Permanente
 Parchís
 Pastora
 Pata Negra
 Los Payasos de la Tele
 Los Pekenikes
 Pereza
 Els Pets
 Pic-Nic
 Pignoise
 Un Pingüino en mi Ascensor
 The Pinker Tones
 Los Planetas
 Platero y Tú
 La Polla Records
 Los Pop Tops
 Presuntos Implicados
 Proyecto Eskhata
 Los Punsetes

Q
 La Quinta Estación

R
 Radio Futura
 Reincidentes
 Os Resentidos
 Revolver
 Los Rodríguez
 Russian Red

S
 Sangtraït
 Sangre Azul
 Santa Justa Klan
 Saratoga
 Sau
 Sauze
 Savia
 Sergio y Estíbaliz
 Sex Museum
 Sexy Sadie
 SFDK
 
 Siempre Así
 Siniestro Total
 Los Sírex
 Ska-P
 Skalariak
 Skizoo
 Smash
 Sôber
 Sonblue
 Sopa de Cabra
 Soziedad Alkoholika
 Stravaganzza
 Los Suaves
 El Sueño de Morfeo
 Las Supremas de Móstoles

T
 Tahúres zurdos
 Tako
 Tequila
 Tess
 Tierra Santa
 Los Toreros Muertos
 Tote King
 Triana
 Txarango

U
 El Último de la Fila
 The Unfinished Sympathy

V
 Van Tard
 Vulpes
 Violadores del verso

W
 WarCry

Z
 Zero db
 ZPU

Spain
Spain
Lists of organisations based in Spain